The Chief Justice of Zanzibar is the highest judge of Zanzibar, part of the state United Republic of Tanzania. He is appointed by the President of Zanzibar in consultation with the Judicial Services Commission and presides over the High Court for Zanzibar.

History
Zanzibar became a British protectorate following the Anglo-German Agreement of 1890. An Order of Council created Her Britannic Majesty's Court for Zanzibar with a presiding judge in 1897 and another Order established the High Court in 1925. The protectorate gained its independence in December 1963 as a constitutional monarchy and after a revolution a month later was transformed into the Republic of Zanzibar and Pemba.

In 1964 it merged with Tanganyika into the United Republic of Tanganyika and Zanzibar, which later in that year was renamed to United Republic of Tanzania. Despite the unification both parts of the new state retained their former judicial systems.

Chief Judges of Zanzibar
1897–1901: Walter Borthwick Cracknall
1901–1904: George Bettesworth Piggott
1904–1914: Lindsey Smith
1915–1919: James William Murison
1919–1925: Thomas Symonds Tomlinson

Chief Justices of Zanzibar
1925–1928: Thomas Symonds Tomlinson
1928–1933: George Hunter Pickering
1934–1939: Charles Ewan Law
1939–1941: John Verity
1941–1952: John Milner Gray
1952–1955: George Gilmour Robinson
1955–1959: Ralph Windham
1959–1964: Gerald MacMahon Mahon
1964–1969: Revolutionary Council (Chief Justice: Geoffrey Jonas Horsfall)
1970–1978: Ali Haji Pandu
1985–2011: Hamid Mahmoud Hamid
2011–2021 Omar Makungu
2021-Khamis Ramadhan Abdalla

See also
Chief Justice of Tanzania

Notes

References

Chief Justice
Zanzibar